Bid-e Lang or Bidlang may refer to:
 Bid-e Lang, Sistan and Baluchestan